Microvirga indica is a Gram-negative, non-spore-forming and arsenite-oxidizing bacterium from the genus of Microvirga which has been isolated from metal industry waste soil from Pirangut in India.

References 

Hyphomicrobiales
Bacteria described in 2017